The Battle of Nanyang took place in 1641 and 1642 in Nanyang, an important city in China's Henan Province. This city is an ancient original place of the Silk Road. At the end of the Ming Dynasty, many battles took place in Nanyang. In 1641, Li Zicheng attacked Nanyang and finally took control of the west of this city from the Ming dynasty. In 1642, he attacked Nanyang again and took control of the whole city. And that war was called Battle of Nanyang, which lasted nearly a year.

References

Nanyang
Nanyang
Nanyang
Rebellions in the Ming dynasty
1641 in Asia
1642 in China
Military history of Henan